The plumbeous vireo (Vireo plumbeus) is a small North American songbird, ranging from far southeastern Montana and western South Dakota south to the Pacific coast of Mexico, including the extreme southern regions of Baja California Sur. It is migratory, moving to the southern part of its range in winter, and its habitat generally encompasses open pine forests.

The plumbeous vireo is 4.75 inches (12 cm) in length, with a gray head, back, and flanks, and whitish underparts.  It has a solid white eye ring and white wing bars.

The song, given persistently, consists of short, rough whistled phrases of several notes, spaced about 2 seconds apart. The phrases often alternate ending on a high note and a low note, giving an impression of question and answer.

The plumbeous vireo builds a cup nest out of bark strips and down in the fork of a twig.  It lays 3 to 5 white eggs with some brown spots.

This species was formerly considered to belong to the same species as Cassin's vireo and blue-headed vireo.  At that time, this complex of species was referred to as the "solitary vireo".

References

External links
 Plumbeous Vireo species account Cornell Lab of Ornithology
 Plumbeous Vireo at USGS
 Plumbeous Vireo from eNature.com, including photograph
 Page with recordings of the Plumbeous Vireo from Naturesongs, accessed June 20, 2006
 Plumbeous Vireo photo gallery VIREO-(Visual Resources for Ornithology)
 Photo: bird and nest-High Res; Article pbase.com(T.Munson)
 Photo: bird on nest-High Res; Article, w/photo gallery(HighRes) "Utah Birds" www.utahbirds.org
 Photo-High Res; Article-(with synopsis fireflyforest.net
 The Plumber—photo gallery at the blog Not just birds

plumbeous vireo
Birds of Mexico
Birds of El Salvador
Birds of Guatemala
Birds of Honduras
Birds of the Rio Grande valleys
Fauna of the Mojave Desert
plumbeous vireo
Birds of the Sierra Madre Occidental